Artem Mykolaiovych Morozov (born 29 February 1980) is a Ukrainian rower. He competed in the double sculls at the 2012 Summer Olympics. He won the gold medal in the quadruple sculls at the 2014 World Rowing Championships in Amsterdam.

References

External links
 
 

1980 births
Living people
Ukrainian male rowers
Sportspeople from Kherson
Rowers at the 2012 Summer Olympics
Rowers at the 2016 Summer Olympics
Olympic rowers of Ukraine
World Rowing Championships medalists for Ukraine
European Rowing Championships medalists